Monmouth Mayhill railway station (alternatively Monmouth May Hill railway station) is a disused railway station on the Ross and Monmouth Railway which was opened in 1873 and closed in 1959. It was one of two stations that served the town of Monmouth, Wales and was situated on the opposite bank of the river River Wye from Monmouth. It was the initial terminus of the line, but the line was extended across the River Wye to the junction station of Monmouth Troy in 1874 with the construction of the Duke of Beaufort Bridge.

Mayhill was originally opened as a temporary station, but it soon became permanent. It was built on the site of May Hill Wharf, where goods were loaded onto barges on the River Wye. Sidings at Mayhill once served a timber yard and gas works. The station building was demolished but the single platform still exists, in the middle of an industrial estate.

References

External links
 Station on 1947 OS Map
Subterranea Britannica: Monmouth May Hill Station
disused-stations.org.uk

Railway stations in Great Britain opened in 1873
Railway stations in Great Britain closed in 1959
Former Great Western Railway stations
Disused railway stations in Monmouthshire
Transport in Monmouthshire
History of Monmouthshire
Buildings and structures in Monmouth, Wales